Curtis Court is an American arbitration-based reality court show, hosted by James Curtis. It aired for one season, the 2000-01 television season.  The show was produced and distributed by King World (now CBS Television Distribution).

References

External links
Curtis Court at the Internet Movie Database

2000s American legal television series
2000 American television series debuts
2001 American television series endings
First-run syndicated television programs in the United States
Court shows